Guitar Country is the twenty-fourth studio album by American guitarist Chet Atkins. It was nominated for the 1964 Best Country & Western Album Grammy award but did not win. It reached number 1 on the Country albums charts. Prior to 1964, there was no separate genre chart for Country LPs, thus Chet's previous charting albums were on the Pop charts. Numerous future Atkins releases "crossed over" from the Country and Pop charts.

Reissues
 Guitar Country and More of That Guitar Country were reissued together on CD in 2001 on the Collectibles label.

Track listing

Side one
 "Freight Train" (Charles Albertine) – 2:03
 "A Little Bit of Blues" (Jerry Reed) – 2:58
 "Nine Pound Hammer" (Merle Travis) – 2:26
 "Dobro" (Atkins, Cy Coben) – 1:59
 "Kentucky" (Karl Davis) – 2:53
 "Vaya con Dios" (Larry Russell, Inez James, Buddy Pepper) – 2:23

Side two
 "Winter Walkin'" (Jerry Reed) – 2:01
 "Guitar Country" (Johnny Mercer, Willard Robison) – 2:39
 "Sugarfoot Rag" (Hank Garland, Vaughn) – 2:01
 "Gone" (Smokey Rogers) – 2:01
 "Copper Kettle" (Albert F. Beddoe) – 2:10
 "Yes Ma'am" (Jerry Reed) – 2:15

Personnel
Chet Atkins – guitar
Ray Edenton - rhythm guitar
Henry Strzelecki - bass
Bill Pursell - piano (Yes Ma'am)
Floyd Cramer - electric piano
Jim Carney - drums

Production notes
Produced by Bob Ferguson
Bill Porter - recording engineer

References

1964 albums
Chet Atkins albums
Albums produced by Bob Ferguson (music)
RCA Victor albums